"What to Expect When Bart's Expecting" is the nineteenth episode of the twenty-fifth season of the American animated television series The Simpsons and the 549th episode of the series. It originally aired on the Fox network in the United States on April 27, 2014. It was written by John Frink and directed by Matthew Nastuk. In the episode, Bart makes a voodoo doll of his hippie art teacher when he gets sick of art class and cast a spell to make her sick, but when he inadvertently gets her pregnant, he becomes a savior to Springfield couples trying to conceive—and is subsequently kidnapped to help conceive a thoroughbred race horse.

Plot
As Barney Gumble walks into Moe's, he notices that it is closed for a meeting. Moe is holding a meeting with the other bars in Springfield to discuss how their customer turnout has been low. When Moe holds a superhero themed bar crawl, Homer and his buddies join in the festivities, leaving Homer passed out in front of his home in the morning before Bart and Lisa leave on the school bus. Meanwhile, Bart feels smothered by his art teacher, who encourages nothing but the best from her students, and wants to get rid of her. When Bart visits a voodoo specialist, he receives some materials to cast a spell on his art teacher, yet his teacher still shows up to class the next day surprising Bart. Even though the spell was meant for a stomachache, Bart receives some startling news that his teacher is pregnant.

Ralph announces that Bart got the art teacher pregnant. The student body, including Lisa, is in disbelief until Milhouse came up with the same announcement. After a meeting with Principal Skinner Homer picks his son up and scolds him on how embarrassing it is to find out Bart's bad news during his arraignment. At home Bart is forced to assist Marge in cleaning out her car as punishment. When a couple approaches Bart about his baby-making skills, Bart utilizes his voodoo spell etiquette to give a couple a baby. The spell works, and the couple returns to ask Bart if he could cast the same spell for their couple friends in the same position. Before long, Bart has opened a fertility through voodoo clinic. Homer takes Bart to Moe's to discuss Bart's problems before Fat Tony's cronies come into the bar to kidnap them.

Upon meeting Fat Tony, he orders Bart to work his baby magic on his horses to create a champion racehorse. Bart immediately blames Homer for this situation due to the his mediocre fathering techniques and blames them for leading Bart done he is on now. Homer sees this as an opportunity to show Bart how babies are made and make up for his awful parenting. However the stallion communicates that he is gay by playing "It's Raining Men". Homer then finds former Duff Beer advertising horse Sudsley Brew-Right, and tries to convince the mare to mate with him in a musical number. They are successful and a pregnancy test comes back positive. The Simpsons are then seen giving advice to the equine couple, after which the gay stallion nuzzles up to Sudsley. Lisa remarks "Now, that's a modern family", which is followed by a parody of the opening sequence of Modern Family.

The episode ends with a mock advertisement for Duff Beer seven-packs, featuring Sudsley.

Reception
Dennis Perkins of The A.V. Club gave the episode a B−, saying "A serviceably funny episode with some good lines and an appearance from a reliable guest star, ’What To Expect When Bart’s Expecting’ nonetheless reiterates that current Simpsons episodes have a ceiling for what they can accomplish—and that it’s lower than it used to be."

Teresa Lopez of TV Fanatic gave the episode two and a half stars out of four, saying "Once the central conflict is exposed, the writers seek to include some point to all this madness. Bart blames Homer for his bad behavior because he isn't a good role model, referencing his most recent exploits at the Superhero pub crawl (one of the few moments of true hilarity in this episode). Bart has a point, but it's one that has been made many times (and in better ways) in the past. Here, it just seemed useless."

The episode received a 1.6 rating and was watched by a total of 3.45 million people, making it the second most watched show on Animation Domination that night.

References

External links 
 
 "What to Except When Bart's Expecting" at theSimpsons.com

2014 American television episodes
The Simpsons (season 25) episodes